In the 1987 season, the Soviet Top Leaguethe top tier of football in the Soviet Union was won by Spartak Moscow interupting the two year championship run of the Kyiv's team. Dynamo Kyiv, the defending 12-times champions, placed sixth and failed to qualify for the European competitions, while their rivals Dynamo Moscow placed only 10th.

This season CSKA Moscow were relegated on additional criteria when they tied on points with Zenit Leningrad at the final standing.

Teams

Promoted teams
 FC CSKA Moscow – champion (returning after two seasons)
 FC Guria Lanchkhuti – 2nd place (debut)

Location

Final standings

Promotion
 Lokomotiv Moscow
 Chornomorets Odessa

Results

Top scorers
18 goals
 Oleh Protasov (Dnepr)

16 goals
 Arminas Narbekovas (Žalgiris)

12 goals
 Fyodor Cherenkov (Spartak Moscow)
 Sergei Rodionov (Spartak Moscow)

10 goals
 Georgi Kondratyev (Dinamo Minsk)
 Yuri Savichev (Torpedo Moscow)

9 goals
 Alexei Mikhailichenko (Dynamo Kiev)
 Yevstafi Pekhlevanidi (Kairat)
 Ramaz Shengelia (Dynamo Tbilisi)

8 goals
 Ihor Belanov (Dynamo Kiev)

Clean sheets

15 matches
 Andrei Satsunkevich (Dinamo Minsk)

14 matches
 Rinat Dasayev (Spartak Moscow)

10 matches
 Viktor Chanov (Dynamo Kyiv)

6 matches
 Vyacheslav Chanov (CSKA Moscow)

4 matches
 Dmitri Kharine (Dynamo Moscow)

3 matches
 Aleksandr Zhidkov (Neftchi Baku)
 Jurkus Vatslovas (Zalgiris Vilnius)
 Serhiy Zolotnytskyi (Shakhtar Donetsk)

Medal squads
(league appearances and goals listed in brackets)

Number of teams by union republic

References

 Soviet Union - List of final tables (RSSSF)

Soviet Top League seasons
1
Soviet
Soviet